This is a list of issue covers of the Brazilian edition of Playboy magazine.  The entries on this table include each cover's subjects.  This list is for the regular monthly issues of the Brazilian Playboy, as well as its 1975–1980 predecessor, A Revista do Homem; any one-time-only special issues are not included.

While a monthly magazine under Editora Abril, the magazine has had uneven periodicity since its change to dedicated publisher PBB Entertainment in 2016.

1970s

1980s

1990s

2000s

2010s

References

All Playboy covers, Terra Brasil

Brazil
Playboy